George Frederick Robert Sims (3 August 1923, Hammersmith – 4 November 1999, Reading, Berkshire), also known as George Sims, was an English antiquarian bookseller and writer of crime thrillers. He was born in the Hammersmith district of London in 1923, the son of a shoe merchant. He was educated at the John Lyons School in Harrow. He married Beryl Simcock in 1943, with whom he had three children. He served in the Intelligence Corps in the final years of World War II. After the war, he started working at Len Westwood's bookshop in Harrow before setting up as a mail order bookseller under the name of G.F. Sims. In 1952, he moved to the village of Hurst in Berkshire and remained there till his death.

As a writer, Sims published poetry, crime thrillers, and four volumes of memoirs. Several of his novels were published in Penguin paperback and won praise from figures such as H.R.F. Keating, Maurice Richardson, Roy Fuller and Evelyn Waugh.

References

1923 births
1999 deaths
English booksellers
English crime fiction writers
English thriller writers
English male novelists
People from Hammersmith
Intelligence Corps soldiers
20th-century English novelists
20th-century English poets
English male poets
English memoirists
20th-century English male writers
20th-century English businesspeople